Barolineocerus furcatus is a species of leafhopper native to Colombia and Brazil. It is named for the unusual inner protrusion on the last segment of the abdomen on the male which is bifurcated at the apex. It is distinguished from other species in the genus on the basis of the bifurcated abdomen.

References 

Hemiptera of South America
Arthropods of Colombia
Endemic fauna of Colombia
Fauna of the Amazon
Insects described in 2008
Eurymelinae